The 1986 British Columbia general election was the 34th general election in the Province of British Columbia, Canada. It was held to elect members of the Legislative Assembly of British Columbia. The sitting Social Credit government was re-elected.

The election was called on September 24, 1986.  The election was held on October 22, 1986, and the new legislature met for the first time on March 9, 1987.

The governing British Columbia Social Credit Party (Socreds) had seen a leadership change just months before the election, with Bill Bennett standing down in favour of  Bill Vander Zalm.  Promising a fresh start after the Bennett years, Vander Zalm led the Socreds to a fourth consecutive majority government, although with winning less than half of the popular vote. 12 new seats had been created in the legislature for this election. Social Credit coincidentally won 12 additional seats, while the social democratic New Democratic Party, led by Bob Skelly, won the same number it had in the previous election. No other parties won seats. In fact the two leading parties together - SC and NDP - took more than 90 percent of the votes.

There were 17 two-member constituencies in this election. Voters in these places were allowed two votes (Block Voting), and generally used them both on the same party, with the largest group (even if not a majority) taking both seats. 

Only one district elected both a SC and a NDP MLA. This was Vancouver-Point Grey where two women, an NDP-er and a SC-er (Kim Campbell, later a Canadian prime minister), were elected.

All other districts elected either two SC-ers (12 districts) or two NDP-ers (four districts), with no representation given to the minority vote in the district. This helped ensure the government's capture of the most seats. (It also makes the "popular vote," the votes cast, not truly reflective of the sentiment of the voters, due to some voters casting two votes and others only one.) 

This was the last election to be held with multi-member districts; BC moved to all single-member districts prior to the next election.

Results

Note:
* Party did not nominate candidates in the previous election.

See also
List of British Columbia political parties

References

Further reading

External links
Elections BC 1986 Election

1986
British Columbia general election
General election
British Columbia general election